Wendu Township (Mandarin: 文都藏族乡) is a township in Xunhua Salar Autonomous County, Haidong, Qinghai, China. In 2010, Wendu Township had a total population of 8,677 people: 4,463 males and 4,214 females: 1,913 under 14 years old, 6,173 aged between 15 and 64 and 586 over 65 years old.

References 
 

Township-level divisions of Qinghai
Ethnic townships of the People's Republic of China
Haidong